Denis Maximiliano Ferreira Fernández (born 15 August 1999) is a Uruguayan professional footballer who plays as a midfielder for Cerrito.

Career
Ferreira began his career with Cerrito, appearing for the first-team during the 2018 Uruguayan Segunda División season. He made his professional debut on 15 September during an away defeat to Plaza Colonia, which was one of three appearances in that campaign as Cerrito finished fourth.

Career statistics
.

References

External links

1999 births
Living people
Footballers from Montevideo
Uruguayan footballers
Association football midfielders
Uruguayan Segunda División players
Sportivo Cerrito players